Patron-Minette was the name given to a street gang in Victor Hugo's 1862 novel Les Misérables and the musical of the same name. The gang consisted of four criminals:  Montparnasse, Claquesous, Babet, and Gueulemer. They were well acquainted with the Thénardiers, who recruited them to assist in robbing Jean Valjean.

Hugo explains that the name "Patron-Minette" is an old-fashioned slang expression for the early dawn, "the hour at which their work ended, the dawn being the vanishing moment for phantoms and for the separation of ruffians".

Character descriptions

Montparnasse was, in the words of Hugo, "scarcely more than a child, a youth of under twenty with a pretty face, cherry-lips, glossy dark hair and the brightness of Springtime in his eyes. ... The gamin turned vagabond and the vagabond become an assassin ... A fashion plate living in squalor and committing murder." He is referred to as Thénardier's "unofficial son-in-law" after having an intimate liaison with Éponine during the attempted robbery at Gorbeau house. In a later attempt to mug Valjean he is easily overpowered. After lecturing the thief, Valjean gives him a purse with a little over six napoléons inside, but Gavroche steals it to give to M. Mabeuf, an old horticulturist that was falling into debt. Montparnasse later seeks out Gavroche to help Thénardier escape from prison.

Claquesous is described by Hugo as a creature of the night, and a vague underworld dweller at best, a ventriloquist, more often masked than not and shrouded in a thick cloud of mystery. He is possibly a police informer, given his almost miraculous talent for escaping police custody, most notably after Javert captures the gang at Gorbeau house. Javert ponders, "Had Claquesous melted into the shadows like a snow-flake in water? Had there been unavowed connivance of the police agents?" Under the name of Le Cabuc he joins the revolutionaries at the barricade, where he is shot by Enjolras for murdering an innocent citizen. Hugo suggests that he may have been sent to discredit the revolutionaries.

Babet was a jack of all trades, a performer, a doctor, tall and thin with "daylight ... visible through his bones".  He had a family (a wife and children) at one point, but lost them "as one loses a pocket handkerchief".

Gueulemer is described as the most physically imposing of the gang members, "a Hercules ... come down in the world".  However, he was known to have very little brain.

In the novel

The gang are introduced with one of Hugo's long philosophical disquisitions on the relationship between different kinds of underground culture, set up as a contrast with the student revolutionaries of the Friends of the ABC. Their identities are constantly shifting, via a series of assumed names.

Anne Ubersfeld notes that they are associated with theatre, all having worked in street theatre as bit-part actors or clowns, creating "a theatricality in the lower depths, a social theater of crime, a carnival of horror". When they are contacted by Thenadier to rob Valjean, they wear theatrical masks. Valjean frees Javert from the revolutionaries, just as Javert's intervention rescued Valjean from the gang's attempt to rob him.

They are also linked to irrationality and superstition. When Éponine intervenes to disrupt their plan to invade Valjean's house, the gang withdraws after convincing themselves that they have witnessed a series of bad omens.

In the musical
The character of Gueulemer is replaced by Brujon, a criminal who appears in the novel as an associate of the gang but not as one of the Patron-Minette quartet. The gang first appears in Look Down/The Robbery/Javert's Intervention at which point they are introduced to the audience by Thénardier ("Everyone here?/You know your place./ Brujon, Babet, Claquesous!/ You, Montparnasse/ Watch for the law with Éponine..."). Montparnasse also appears in a brief scene with Éponine at the beginning of "The Attack on Rue Plumet", in which she discovers the impending attack on Valjean's house. That scene is often cut from recordings. The gang attempts to rob Jean Valjean's house until Éponine, afraid that Marius will think her a criminal, screams to send them away.

References

Les Misérables characters
Fictional French people
Literary characters introduced in 1862
Fictional gangs